The 2016–17 Cypriot Third Division was the 46th season of the Cypriot third-level football league. P.O. Xylotymbous won their 1st title.

Format
Sixteen teams participated in the 2016–17 Cypriot Third Division. All teams played against each other twice, once at their home and once away. The team with the most points at the end of the season crowned champions. The first three teams were promoted to the 2016–17 Cypriot Second Division and the last three teams were relegated to the 2016–17 STOK Elite Division. However, after the end of the season Nikos & Sokratis Erimis withdrew from the 2016–17 Cypriot Third Division, and so the 14th-placed team remained to Third Division.

Point system
Teams received three points for a win, one point for a draw and zero points for a loss.

Changes from previous season
Teams promoted to 2016–17 Cypriot Second Division
 Akritas Chlorakas
 Alki Oroklini
 Ethnikos Assia

Teams relegated from 2015–16 Cypriot Second Division
 Elpida Xylofagou 
 Nikos & Sokratis Erimis
 Digenis Oroklinis

Teams promoted from 2015–16 STOK Elite Division
 Livadiakos/Salamina Livadion
 Peyia 2014
 AEN Ayiou Georgiou Vrysoullon-Acheritou

Teams relegated to 2016–17 STOK Elite Division
 Kouris Erimis
 Amathus Ayiou Tychona

Stadia and locations

League standings

Results

Season statistics

Top scorers
Including matches played on 30 April 2017; Source: Cyprus Football Association

Sources

See also
 Cypriot Third Division
 2016–17 Cypriot First Division
 2016–17 Cypriot Second Division
 2016–17 Cypriot Cup for lower divisions

References

Cypriot Third Division seasons
Cyprus
2016–17 in Cypriot football